The 2018–19 All-Ireland Junior Club Hurling Championship was the 16th staging of the All-Ireland Junior Club Hurling Championship, the Gaelic Athletic Association's junior inter-county club hurling tournament. The championship ran from 14 October 2018 to 10 February 2019.

The All-Ireland final was played on 10 February 2019 at Croke Park in Dublin, between Dunnamaggin from Kilkenny and Castleblayney from Monaghan, in what was their first ever meeting in the final. Dunnamaggin won the match by 1-17 to 1-13 to claim their first ever championship title.

Castleblayney's Fergal Rafter was the championship's top scorer with 3-48.

Connacht Junior Club Hurling Championship

Connacht semi-final

Connacht final

Leinster Junior Club Hurling Championship

Leinster first round

Leinster quarter-finals

Leinster semi-finals

Leinster final

Munster Junior Club Hurling Championship

Munster quarter-final

 Boherlahan-Dualla received a bye in this round as there were no Clare representatives.

Munster semi-finals

Munster final

Ulster Senior Club Hurling Championship

Ulster quarter-finals

Ulster semi-finals

Ulster final

All-Ireland Junior Club Hurling Championship

All-Ireland quarter-final

All-Ireland semi-finals

All-Ireland final

Championship statistics

Top scorers

Overall

In a single game

Miscellaneous

 Castleblayney Faughs became the first club to win three Ulster Championship titles.

References

All-Ireland Junior Club Hurling Championship
All-Ireland Junior Club Hurling Championship
2017